Leya Buchanan (born 17 August 1996) is a Canadian sprinter from Mississauga, Ontario. She competed in the women's 100 metres at the 2017 World Championships in Athletics.

References

External links
 
 
 

1996 births
Living people
Canadian female sprinters
Athletes from Mississauga
World Athletics Championships athletes for Canada
Athletes (track and field) at the 2019 Pan American Games
Pan American Games track and field athletes for Canada
Pan American Games silver medalists for Canada
Pan American Games medalists in athletics (track and field)
Medalists at the 2019 Pan American Games